Mirabal is a surname. Notable people with the surname include:

 The Mirabal sisters, natives of the Dominican Republic who opposed the dictatorship of Rafael Leónidas Trujillo
 Robert Mirabal, Pueblo musician and Native American flute player
 Jesús Mirabal, former Cuban decathlete
 Rafita Mirabal (born 1997), Mexican bullfighter
 Manuel "Guajiro" Mirabal, Cuban trumpeter

See also
 Hermanas Mirabal Province, a province of the Dominican Republic